Feltham was a constituency, between 1955 and 1974, of the House of Commons of the UK Parliament.  It was used for five general elections and no by-elections and at each election returned the candidate of the Labour Party.

Boundaries
Components
1955—1974: The Urban District of Feltham (Feltham, Bedfont and Hanworth), and the Borough of Heston and Isleworth wards of Cranford and Hounslow Heath (as to "Cranford" being the more populous eastern half of former parish).

In local government terms the area became the western parts of the London Borough of Hounslow due to the creation of Greater London on 1 April 1965 and formally recited as such ward-by-ward in legislation of 1970.

Geographic context
The constituency was named after Feltham, a late-19th century small town in the west of the administrative county of Middlesex — a county abolished on the further growth of London in 1965. During the seat's existence major industries included gravel works, railway works, aircraft maintenance, repairs and airport ancillary industries, motor sales and repairs, haulage, distribution and small-to-medium scale parts assembly and manufacture.

Predecessor seats
Before 1955 the Urban District of Feltham, in its latter years taking in Feltham, Hanworth and Bedfont, were in the Spelthorne constituency created in 1918; Cranford and Hounslow West (Hounslow Heath) were parts of the Heston and Isleworth constituency, created in 1945.

Successor seat
In the 1974 redistribution the seat was abolished to become the core of the new Feltham and Heston constituency, which added Heston to the north-east and most of the centre of the larger town of Hounslow to the east.

Members of Parliament

The area elected one MP as it post-dated the abolition of the last multi-member constituencies in 1950.

Elections

Elections in the 1950s

Elections in the 1960s

Elections in the 1970s

See also
List of former United Kingdom Parliament constituencies

References
 Boundaries of Parliamentary Constituencies 1885-1972, compiled and edited by F.W.S. Craig (Parliamentary Reference Publications 1972)
 British Parliamentary Election Results 1950-1973, compiled and edited by F.W.S. Craig (Parliamentary Research Services 1983)
 Who's Who of British Members of Parliament, Volume IV 1945-1979, edited by M. Stenton and S. Lees (Harvester Press 1981)

Specific

Politics of the London Borough of Hounslow
Parliamentary constituencies in London (historic)
Constituencies of the Parliament of the United Kingdom established in 1955
Constituencies of the Parliament of the United Kingdom disestablished in 1974